The 38th Young Artist Awards ceremony, presented by the Young Artist Association, honored excellence of young performers between the ages of 5 to 18 in the fields of film, television, theatre and the internet for the 2016 calendar year. Winners were announced on March 17, 2017, at the annual ceremony and banquet luncheon held at the Alex Theatre in Glendale, California.

Winners and nominees 
★ Winners were announced on March 17, 2017.

Best Performance in a Feature Film

Best Performance in a Digital TV Series or Film

Best Performance in a Short Film

Best Performance in a TV Movie or Special

Best Performance in a TV Series

Best Performance in a TV Commercial

Best Performance in a Voice-Over Role

Best New Media Performance

References

External links 

Young Artist Awards ceremonies
March 2017 events in the United States
2017 in California